Kronprinsessegade 34 is a Neoclassical property overlooking Rosenborg Castle Garden in central Copenhagen, Denmark. It was listed on the Danish registry of protected buildings and places in 1945.

History
Kronprinsessegade 34 was built by Carl Maij in 1805-1806: The writer Henrik Hertz (1798-1870) lived in the building from 1843 to 1849. The writer and educator Athalia Schwartz (1821-1871) was a resident in 1856.

Ole Baden 's book binding business was the 1910s based in the building. Niels Baden, who took over the operations in 1917, moved it to new premises iat Lolle Strandstræde 10 in 1919. Grann & Laglye, a silver factory founded by Johannes Grann (1885-1945) and Jean Laglye (born 1878) in 1906, was in 1950 based in the building.

Architecture
The building is five storeys tall and six bays wide. A four-bay frieze is located between the second and third floor and under the roof is a cornice supported by brackets. A short side wing projects from the rear side of the building. It consists of two full bays and a canted bay towards the main wing.

Today
The building contains a combination of residential apartments and offices. Current residents include the Svend Toxværd  silversmithy and  Donsmark Process Technology.

References

External links

Listed residential buildings in Copenhagen
Residential buildings completed in 1806
1806 establishments in Denmark